Production and Labour is a minor peronist political party in San Juan Province, Argentina. Its founder and leader is Roberto Basualdo, who is currently a sitting National Senator and was a National Deputy from 2001 to 2005. The party was formed in 2005 ahead of the legislative election in San Juan, where it became the first minority in the provincial Senate. It is currently part of the Juntos por el Cambio coalition.

In addition to the Senate, the party also counts with representation in the Chamber of Deputies through deputy Marcelo Orrego, elected in 2019. Orrego sits in the Juntos por el Cambio parliamentary group.

References

Political parties established in 2005
2005 establishments in Argentina
Peronist parties and alliances in Argentina
Provincial political parties in Argentina